Monster is the twentieth and final studio album by American rock band Kiss, released on October 9, 2012. It was recorded at Conway Recording Studios in Hollywood, California and The Nook in Studio City, Los Angeles. Monster was produced by Paul Stanley and co-produced by Greg Collins, as was 2009's Sonic Boom. It is the second studio release by the current band line-up, with Tommy Thayer on lead guitar and Eric Singer on drums, alongside founding members Paul Stanley and Gene Simmons.

Background
Gene Simmons first mentioned Kiss' intention to record a follow-up to Sonic Boom in 2010. On March 10, 2011, Simmons said in a radio interview for Heavy Metal Thunder that the band will enter the studio in three weeks and that they have around 20 to 25 songs ready to record.

In an interview with Elliot Segal on Elliot in the Morning, May 2, 2011, Simmons mentioned that Kiss had recorded around five songs. The album was originally supposed to contain ten songs, but he revealed before the American Music Awards of 2011 that Monster will contain fifteen brand new songs, all studio written by the band. This was then reduced to thirteen songs.

On August 21, 2011, Kiss officially revealed the album's title and confirmed that it was being recorded in Los Angeles, with Paul Stanley producing, for a 2012 release.

The band uploaded a video on January 3, 2012, on YouTube in which Stanley commented that the album was two to three days from completion. The recording process ended three days later. The following day, Stanley stated, "Listening to the tracks back to back is like sensory overload. Everyone who has heard any of it is completely blown away. Powerful, heavy, melodic and epic. It makes us very proud. You all will be too."

The album's first single, "Hell or Hallelujah", was released on July 2, 2012, internationally and July 3 in North America along with the Monster Book. It received play on rock radio and climbed onto the middle reaches of the Billboard Mainstream Rock Chart. The second single, "Long Way Down", was released to radio stations on October 23. While it failed to make the Billboard Mainstream Rock Chart, it did reach the Billboard Heritage Rock Charts by the end of the year, and also occupied a spot on America's Music Rock Chart for several months.

After several release delays, Monster was released in the U.S. on October 9, 2012.

Composition
According to an interview with Tommy Thayer, the band had the intention of creating an album with a slightly heavier sound than Sonic Boom, as well as recreating the vibe that existed on the band's earlier material. Similarly, Simmons has likened the album to a combination of three of the band's previous albums, Destroyer, Revenge and Sonic Boom.

While doing interviews for his appearance in ABC's Castle, Simmons commented on the album's sound: "Meat and potatoes. You know it's going to be like Santa Claus. Up and down, everybody gets used to this and that, and things change, and fashion changes, but it's good to know that Santa comes, and he's not going to change his outfit and you know what you're going to get: gifts. Consistency of message."

The band also decided to use old analog equipment instead of more popular digital recording gear. In justifying Kiss' choice, Simmons commented: "Technology is a seductive bitch, she will seduce you. You press this button, you don't have to do anything. But analog is the love of your life. You can push real hard and it always gives back. For the new album, the actual recording process was 24-track tape and an old Trident board. And as many tubes as possible. You need tubes, electricity and thick wood to make that thick sound."

On March 22, 2012, Stanley said in an interview with VH1 Radio Network's Dave Basner, "Monster is really the culmination of everything this band has been in the past and where we're going. When we did Sonic Boom, it was a big task for us because we were saying, 'How do we define who we are today without losing who we've been?' So, that was a tall order for us, but once we got that under our belts, we wanted to go back in and Monster is far, far beyond anything we've done in terms of Sonic Boom and yet it's right up there with some of the best stuff we've done. It's KISS."

Monster debuted at #3 on the Billboard 200, making it the band's third consecutive album to reach the top three in the US, and cracked the Top 10 charts in Canada, Czech Republic, Norway, Sweden, Australia, Germany, Austria, Switzerland, Italy, Finland, Japan, and Danish charts and cracked the Top 20 in the UK, Spain, Hungary and the Dutch charts.

The album sold approximately 60,000 copies in its first week of release in the United States and 120,000 copies outside of the domestic US in its first week.

Track listing

Personnel
Credits for Monster adapted from liner notes.

Members
 Paul Stanley – vocals, rhythm guitar
 Gene Simmons – vocals, bass
 Tommy Thayer – lead guitar, vocals
 Eric Singer – drums, vocals

Additional personnel
 Brian Whelan – piano on "Freak"

Production
 Tom Jermann – art direction, design
 Greg Collins – recording, mixing
 Eric Weaver – assistant engineering
 Martin Cooke – assistant engineering
 Matt Wiggers – assistant engineering
 Seth Waldmann – assistant engineering
 Russell Lee – photography
 Brian Lowe – photography
 Rob Jacobs – product manager
 Ute Friesleben – production manager
 Doc McGhee – management

Chart positions

Album

Singles

|-
|Right Here Right Now"|

References

External links

Official website

2012 albums
Albums produced by Paul Stanley
Kiss (band) albums
Universal Music Group albums